The Atlantic Transport Line was an American passenger shipping line based in Baltimore, Maryland. In 1901 the company was folded into the International Mercantile Marine Company (IMM).

History
The line developed with railroad support as an offshoot of Bernard N. Baker's Baltimore Storage and Lighterage Company in 1881. Although American owned, the Atlantic Transport Line operated from Britain, with British registered and manned vessels, most of which were British built. General cargo, live cattle and small numbers of passengers were carried from Baltimore and Philadelphia to British ports and the line developed an excellent reputation for shipping valuable horses.

In 1898 the U.S. Government bought seven of the Line's ten ships for use as military transports in the Spanish–American War (Baker lent another for use as a hospital ship). The line survived this potentially devastating blow because Baker pulled off a sensational deal and bought a British competitor's five brand new ships almost immediately as replacements. The Atlantic Transport Company of West Virginia was formed at this time to assert American ownership of the line's overseas assets. Baker's attempt to sell the line to British owners in the late 1890s sparked the chain of events that lead to the formation of the IMM.

The line's most important ships were all sunk during the First World War. After the war four huge replacements for the Minne class ships were planned. Only two of these were built however and the passenger service, which recommenced in 1923, never matched pre-war successes. With first class travel declining the A.T.L. introduced a tourist third class ship in 1925 and for two seasons operated a second. But the line was faltering even before the Wall Street Crash and with the recession of 1931 its remaining ships were laid up or transferred to other IMM lines and it effectively ceased to exist. The American holding company survived until 1936. The SS Minnewaska was the last ship the Atlantic Transport Line operated.

Fleet

References

Sources

External links
 The Atlantic Transport Line, 1881 - 1931
 Atlantic Transport Line History and Ephemera GG Archives
 

Shipping companies of the United States
History of Baltimore
Companies based in Baltimore
Transatlantic shipping companies